The Nandi Award for Best Male Dubbing Artist winners since 1997:

References

Male Dubbing Artist
Voice acting awards